was a castle located on the Kiso river in Kiso, Nagano, Japan.

History 
Fukushima Castle was the site of the Siege of Kiso-Fukushima led by Takeda Shingen in 1554. The castle's commander,  surrendered the garrison when the food supplies ran out. The castle no longer stands.

References 

Castles in Nagano Prefecture